Casper Mørup Nielsen (born 29 April 1994) is a Danish professional footballer who plays as a midfielder for Belgian club Club Brugge.

He is the son of former Esbjerg top scorer Henrik "Ismand" Nielsen.

Club career

Esbjerg
Nielsen signed his first professional contract with Esbjerg in June 2009 only 15 years old. A few months later, he went on a trial with English Premier League club Manchester City.

His contract was prolonged in January 2013, where he officially was moved up into the Esbjerg first team squad. Later in the season, he made his professional debut on 12 May 2013 in a 2–0 win against Copenhagen.

Odense
In January 2017, Nielsen signed with Danish Superliga team Odense BK on a -year contract,

Union SG
On 4 July 2019, Nielsen joined Belgian club Union SG.

Club Brugge
On 17 July 2022, Club Brugge announced that they had reached an agreement to transfer Nielsen from Union SG. Nielsen signed a four-year contract to keep him with Club through 2026. He scored his first goal for Club on 14 August 2022, the winner in a 3–0 victory over OH Leuven.

International career
He was called up to the senior Denmark squad for friendly matches against the Netherlands and Serbia on 26 and 29 March 2022, respectively.

Career statistics

References

External links
 
 Casper Nielsen on Esbjerg fB
 
 

1994 births
Living people
People from Esbjerg
Sportspeople from the Region of Southern Denmark
Danish men's footballers
Association football midfielders
Denmark under-21 international footballers
Denmark youth international footballers
Danish Superliga players
Belgian Pro League players
Challenger Pro League players
Esbjerg fB players
Odense Boldklub players
Royale Union Saint-Gilloise players
Footballers at the 2016 Summer Olympics
Olympic footballers of Denmark
Danish expatriate men's footballers
Danish expatriate sportspeople in Belgium
Expatriate footballers in Belgium